Roy Creek is a  long 1st order tributary to Assawoman Bay, in Sussex County, Delaware.

Course
Roy Creek rises on the Bearhole Ditch divide about 0.1 miles north of Williamsville in Sussex County, Delaware.  Roy Creek then flows generally southeast to meet Assawoman Bay at Keen-Wik, Delaware.

Watershed
Roy Creek drains  of area, receives about 44.5 in/year of precipitation, has a topographic wetness index of 809.54 and is about 4.0% forested.

See also
List of rivers of Delaware

References 

Rivers of Delaware